Peter Christian Gøtzsche  (born 26 November 1949) is a Danish physician, medical researcher, and former leader of the Nordic Cochrane Center at Rigshospitalet in Copenhagen, Denmark.
He is a co-founder of the Cochrane Collaboration and has written numerous reviews for the organization. His membership in Cochrane was terminated by its Governing Board of Trustees on 25 September 2018.

Biography 
After completing high school, Gøtzsche studied science graduating with a Master of Science in biology and chemistry in 1974. He worked briefly as a teacher. In 1975 he took a job in the pharmaceutical industry as a drug representative for Astra AB; several months later he became a product manager. In 1977 Gøtzsche took a position at Astra-Syntex and was responsible for clinical trials. While at Astra-Syntex he started to study medicine and graduated as a physician in 1984.

Gøtzsche worked at hospitals in Copenhagen 1984–1995. He co-founded with Sir Iain Chalmers and about 80 other investigators The Cochrane Collaboration in 1993. The same year he established The Nordic Cochrane Centre. In 2010, Gøtzsche was named Professor of Clinical Research Design and Analysis at the University of Copenhagen. A professorship that was later retracted from the university. In 2017, he was elected a member of the Governing Board of Cochrane. In September 2018 he was expelled from Cochrane Collaboration. In 2019 Gøtzsche founded a new Institute for Scientific Freedom, whose goal is "to preserve honesty and integrity in science".

Research and reviews 
Among his research findings are that placebo has surprisingly little effect
and that many meta-analyses may have data extraction errors.
Gøtzsche and his coauthors have at times criticized the research methods and interpretations of other scientists, e.g. in meta-analysis of placebo.

Gøtzsche has commented on meta-analysis,
and the editorial independence of medical journals.
He has written about issues surrounding medical ghostwriting with the position that it is scientific misconduct. He has also criticized the widespread use of SSRI antidepressants.

Critique of mammography screening 
Gøtzsche has been critical of screening for breast cancer using mammography, arguing that it cannot be justified; his critique has caused controversy. 
His critique stems from a meta-analysis he did on mammography screening studies and published as Is screening for breast cancer with mammography justifiable? in The Lancet in 2000.
In it he discarded 6 out of 8 studies arguing their randomization was inadequate.

In 2006 a paper by Gøtzsche on mammography screening was electronically published in the European Journal of Cancer ahead of print. 
The journal later removed the paper completely from the journal website without any formal retraction.  
The paper was later published in Danish Medical Bulletin with a short note from the editor,
and Gøtzsche and his coauthors commented on the unilateral retraction that the authors were not involved in.

In 2012 his book Mammography Screening: Truth, Lies and Controversy was published. In 2013 his book Deadly Medicines and Organised Crime: How Big Pharma Has Corrupted Healthcare was published.

Critique of reviews of HPV vaccine 
At the behest of the Danish Health and Medicines Authorities the European Medicines Agency (EMA) was charged to review data in women concerning use of HPV vaccines and the possible development of rare side effects, namely complex regional pain syndrome (CRPS) and postural orthostatic tachycardia syndrome (POTS). EMA's review was issued in November 2015 and found no causal relationship. Louise Brinth, a Danish physician who had published observational studies on POTS, subsequently critiqued the EMA review in a detailed rebuttal. Gøtzsche supported her and issued a formal complaint to the EMA criticizing their report in May 2018.

Gøtzsche et al. also found faults with a 2018 Cochrane review of the HPV vaccine. The review had judged the vaccine as effective and did not find an increased risk of serious adverse effects.

Expulsion from Cochrane 
Gøtzsche, who had been elected to the Governing Board in 2017, was expelled from the Board and the organization after a 6 to 5 vote of the 13-member board at the annual meeting in Edinburgh, Scotland in September 2018. The Board announced the step on September 26 expelling Gøtzsche because of an "ongoing, consistent pattern of disruptive and inappropriate behaviours ..., taking place over a number of years, which undermined this culture and were detrimental to the charity’s work, reputation and members."

Gøtzsche, critical of the pharmaceutical industry and what he sees as its influence on medicine, expressed concern about "growing top-down authoritarian culture and an increasingly commercial business model" at Cochrane that "threaten the scientific, moral and social objectives of the organization." He stated that "Cochrane no longer lives up to its core values of collaboration, openness, transparency, accountability, democracy and keeping the drug industry at arm’s length." After the expulsion, four members of the Board resigned and two had to leave to restore a balance between appointed and elected members, throwing the organization into turmoil.

Gerd Antes of Cochrane Deutschland interpreted the situation as a "governance crisis" and called for "the strict orientation on the objectives and fundamental principles of Cochrane" naming "(s)cientific rigour, knowledge with minimal bias, maximum trust and consistent safeguarding against interest-driven influence on the evidence" as primary.

Books

Reports
 
  Short version of the above:

References

External links
Peter C. Gøtzsche official
Deadly Medicines and Organised Crime official
Institute for Scientific Freedom official

Danish medical researchers
Living people
1949 births
People from Copenhagen
Place of birth missing (living people)
Placebo researchers
Cochrane Collaboration people